Parc Jae-jung (born December 25, 1995) is a South Korean singer. He is well known as the winner of the South Korean singing competition Superstar K 5 in 2013.

Early life 
Parc was born in Seoul, South Korea on December 25, 1995. He developed an interest in music at a young age and learned to play the violin, clarinet, and traditional Korean percussion instruments when he was in elementary school. In 2011, he moved with his family to Florida, where his parents worked as farmers.

Career 
In July 2013, Parc participated in the fifth season of singing competition series Superstar K5. On November 15, 2013, Parc was announced as the winner of the competition and having opportunity to signing with CJ E&M. On November 20, Parc released his pre-debut single "Stalker". On November 22, Parc made his official debut stage on the annual award event Mnet Asian Music Award at Hongkong's Asia World Expo Arena.

On July 17, 2014, Parc released his first EP, Step 1, where contain of five track including the lead single "Ice Ice Baby" featuring Beenzino.

In July 2015, Parc joined Mystic Entertainment after his contract with CJ E&M ended.

On May 19, 2016, Parc released collaboration single "Two Men" with Kyuhyun. They also made performance of "Two Men" in the variety show Radio Star on May 18.

On May 19, 2017, Parc released single "Passport", as a part of Yoon Jongshin's music project Monthly Yong Jongshin 2017 May. In the same month, Parc was cast in the first season of the music variety show Snowball Project. He team-up with Mark Lee of NCT released "Lemonade Love" on July 21, which was produced by Henry Lau and Yoon Jongshin. In August 2017, Parc was cast in the 2017 MBC pilot variety show It's Dangerous Beyond The Blankets. On June 29, Parc released his single "Focus", which was written by Yoon Jongshin and Jung Suk-won of 015B. On October 13, Parc released another single "The Villain", which also written by Yoon Jongshin and Jung Suk-won of 015B. The single is the trilogy of the farewell ballad following "Two Men" and "Focus". On November 11, Parc appeared on "Fantastic Duo 2" as a contestant for Ailee's Star Duo, however gugudan’s Kim Se-jeong was selected as her partner. On December 18, Parc held his first solo concert, Mood In December, at Seoul's Hyundai Card Understage.

On June 8, 2018, Parc released single "Bad Dreams", as a part of Mystic Entertainment's music project LISTEN. His next single "Words" was released on August 4, which is his first self-composed song since debut.

On February 10, 2021, Parc announced that he would be leaving Mystic Story. On April 2, it was confirmed that Parc has signed with Romantic Factory, which houses rappers Ovan and Vinxen. After signed with new agency, Parc released a song titled "I Loved You" on April 18, 2021.

On May, 2021, Parc was revealed as one of the MSG Wannabe members who passed on variety show program Hangout with Yoo and debuted as a member of MSG Wannabe and was part of the sub-unit M.O.M. After the show ended, he actively promoted himself as a solo singer by releasing his two new songs titled "Hobby" and "From That Day" on July 27, 2021.

Parc will hold a solo concert 'Letter 1.5' on May 21 and 22.

In August 2022 it was announced that Parc will release a self written single "Letter to B" on September 1.

On October 30, 2022, Park decided to cancel the concert due to the Seoul Halloween crowd crush.

Discography

Extended plays

Singles

Album appearances

Filmography

Television shows

Music video appearances

Radio shows

Awards and nominations

References

1995 births
Living people
K-pop singers
South Korean rhythm and blues singers
Superstar K winners
Mystic Entertainment artists
South Korean emigrants to the United States
Lake Brantley High School alumni
21st-century South Korean male singers